Garrett Ray Collins, known as Gary "Bo" Collins is a retired college head coach who coached the SIU Edwardsville Cougars baseball team from 1979 to 2012. His teams had 1028 career wins, making him the 56th winningest baseball coach in NCAA baseball and the seventh-highest winner among coaches in NCAA Division II.

Career
A native of East Alton, Illinois and a graduate of Roxana High School, Collins entered Southern Illinois University Edwardsville (SIUE) as a student just before the school initiated intercollegiate athletics. As a junior at SIUE, he became a member of Harry Gallatin's first Cougar basketball team in 1967–68 and a vital member of Roy E. Lee's inaugural baseball team in 1968, returning to play for both teams as a senior. His baseball play earned SIUE Baseball Player of the Year honors in 1969  and resulted in his being the first SIUE student-athlete to be drafted to play professional baseball.

Collins was a 12th round pick of the St. Louis Cardinals in the June, 1969 Major League Baseball draft as a first baseman and outfielder. After two seasons with six clubs in the Cardinal organization, Collins returned to SIUE, becoming an assistant coach for Roy Lee.

Collins spent two seasons as Lee's assistant, then moved to Lewis and Clark Community College as assistant to coach Arnold Copeland. In 1979, Collins returned to SIUE, replacing the retiring Roy Lee as the Cougars head coach. Over the following 34 seasons, Collins' Cougars built a record of  1,028–766–7. In Collins' first thirty years as the Cougar coach, the school continued as the strong Division II program built by Coach Lee, earning fourteen trips to the NCAA Division II Baseball Championship tournament and advancing to the Division II College World Series five times. In 2009, the Cougars began the transition to NCAA Division I, joining the Ohio Valley Conference (OVC). In the team's first year of eligibility, the Cougars qualified for the 2012 OVC Tournament. Having seen the team through its transition to Division I, in July 2012, Collins stepped down as the Cougar's head coach, assuming new duties as SIUE's first Director of Development for Intercollegiate Athletics. He retired from the university in February 2014.

Collins earned his bachelor's degree in Physical Education in 1970 and added a master's degree in counselor education in 1973, both from SIUE.

Collins is one of seven individuals who will be inducted into the American Baseball Coaches Association (ABCA) Hall of Fame in January 2019.

Head coaching record

References

1947 births
Living people
American men's basketball players
SIU Edwardsville Cougars baseball coaches
SIU Edwardsville Cougars baseball players
SIU Edwardsville Cougars men's basketball players
Junior college baseball coaches in the United States
People from Madison County, Illinois
Baseball coaches from Illinois
Baseball players from Illinois
Basketball coaches from Illinois